Narumon Khanan (born January 26, 1983, in Maha Sarakham) is a Thai indoor volleyball. She is a member of the Thailand women's national volleyball team.

Career 
She played with the Thai club  Udonthani for the 2012–13 season.

Club 
  Yesilyurt (2008–2009)
  Udonthani (2012–2013)
  Sisaket (2013–2015)
  3BB Nakornnont (2015–2019)

Awards

Club
 2018 Thai–Denmark Super League -  Third, with 3BB Nakornnont
 2018–19 Thailand League -  Third, with 3BB Nakornnont
 2019 Thai–Denmark Super League -  Third, with 3BB Nakornnont

National team
 1998 Princess Cup -  Champion
 2000 Princess Cup -  Champion
 2001 Summer Universiade -  Bronze Medal
 2001 Asian Championship -  Bronze Medal
 2002 Princess Cup -  Champion
 2002 Asian Junior Championship -  Runner-Up

Royal decoration 
 2010 -  Commander (Third Class) of The Most Admirable Order of the Direkgunabhorn

References

External links
 FIVB Biography

1983 births
Living people
Narumon Khanan
Narumon Khanan
Yeşilyurt volleyballers
Thai expatriate sportspeople in Turkey
Thai autobiographers
Narumon Khanan
Narumon Khanan
Southeast Asian Games medalists in volleyball
Women autobiographers
Competitors at the 2003 Southeast Asian Games
Competitors at the 2005 Southeast Asian Games
Competitors at the 2007 Southeast Asian Games
Competitors at the 2009 Southeast Asian Games
Narumon Khanan
Expatriate volleyball players in Turkey